Sukhumi is a railway station in the capital of Abkhazia — Sukhumi.

History
The railway came to Abkhazia in the early 1930s. In 1940, Abkhazian railway opened from Enguri to Sukhumi and then, in 1942, the Sukhumi — Adler line was opened.

In 1949, Abkhazian Railway became part of the Transcaucasian Railway. The current station building was built in the mid-1950s.

In the beginning of 1992 the following trains were passing Sukhumi:
 Moscow — Tbilisi
 Moscow — Tsqaltubo
 Moscow — Batumi
 Moscow — Sukhumi
 Moscow — Yerevan
 Rostov-on-Don — Yerevan
 Kyiv — Tbilisi
 St.Petersburg — Sukhumi
 Sochi — Yerevan

On 5 December 2002, on the bridge over the Psou river was the train Sukhumi — Sochi. In 2004, on the Abkhazian section of the railway (from Psou to Sukhumi) full-scale restoration work began, carried out by Russian construction companies. Train service was suspended during construction.

On 10 September 2004, Abkhazian railway the Sukhumi — Moscow train began operations.

Trains
 Moscow — Sukhumi
 St.Petersburg — Sukhumi
 Belgorod — Sukhumi

Photos

References

External links
 Abkhazia Railways

Railway stations in Abkhazia
Railway stations in Russia opened in 1940